This is a list of episodes of the second season of The Ellen DeGeneres Show, which aired from September 2004 to June 2005.

Episodes

References

External links
 

2
2004 American television seasons
2005 American television seasons